The 2019–20 season is Reggio Emilia's 46th in existence and the club's 9th consecutive season in the top flight of Italian basketball.

Overview 
The 2019-20 season was hit by the coronavirus pandemic that compelled the federation to suspend and later cancel the competition without assigning the title to anyone. Reggio Emilia ended the championship in 12th position.

Kit 
Supplier: Adidas / Sponsor: GrissinBon

Players 
The team composition is the same as the last game played on February 9 before the interruption of the championship due to the coronavirus pandemic.

Dererk Pardon and Gal Mekel left the team before the early end of the season. The first due to an injury that compromised the rest of the season, while Mekel was transferred to Unicaja Málaga.

Current roster

Depth chart

Squad changes

In

|}

Out

|}

Out on loan
  Federico Bonacini at Pallacanestro Trapani
  Alessandro Vigori at Pallacanestro Mantovana

Confirmed 

|}

From youth team 

|}

Coach

Competitions

Serie A

References 

2019–20 in Italian basketball by club